Indian Lakes Estates is an unincorporated community in Madera County, California. It lies at an elevation of 2247 feet (685 m).

References

Unincorporated communities in California
Unincorporated communities in Madera County, California